8BC was a nightclub, performance space, and art gallery located at 337 East 8th Street in the East Village neighborhood of New York, New York. Founded in 1983, the space closed in late 1985.

History
In 1980 co-founder Cornelius Conboy purchased the building with the intention of opening a theatre. During his time working on Theatre Row, Conboy became aware of the lack of experimental performance support in the area. He came across the space, a former farmhouse, in an area of the East Village described as "Little Dresden" due to the large quantity of burnt out and abandoned buildings. He intended the facility as a casual performance-oriented club space rather than a formal theater. His partner in the venture was Dennis Gattra, a member of a traveling circus and road manager for The Flying Karamazov Brothers.

The space opened on October 31, 1983, with Ucci's Circus Romanus; a four-hour variety show. The small space had a capacity of 200 people and a very large stage, which was longer than the main room of the club, and allowed for large performances. Large murals decorated the exterior and interior, and rotating exhibitions were held showcasing local and regional artists. The space relied solely on cover charges and bar sales, paying its performers a percentage of the admission revenues. 8BC was awarded a Bessie Award for its contributions to the local art community in 1985.

The space closed on October 22, 1985 by agreement with the New York City Department of Buildings due to never obtaining a Certificate of Occupancy to operate and violating zoning regulations for the neighborhood. A few days after the closing, a front-page New York Times article about the demise of 8BC and several other East Village clubs and performance spaces speculated that an era of small downtown New York clubs was being eclipsed by larger enterprises such as Palladium, The Limelight and Area. In 2000, Conboy donated his materials related to 8BC to the Archives of American Art.

Performers
During its first year the space showcased over 650 performances ranging from punk rock bands to cultural performances such as Japanese Butoh. Notable performers include: Karen Finley, Steve Buscemi, John Zorn, They Might Be Giants,  Leisure Class, Ethyl Eichelberger, Holly Hughes, Charles Busch, Rhys Chatham's XS: The Opera Opus, and k.d. lang.

In popular culture
8BC is mentioned in the song "La Vie Bohème" in the musical RENT.

References

Notes

Bibliography
 Hager, Steve. Art After Midnight: The East Village Scene. St. Matins Press, 1986.
Adler, Norma. "Jo Andres' "Liquid TV" at 8BC." The Drama Review 29. 1 (1985): 36-38.
McCormick, Carlo, Marvin J. Taylor, Lynn Gumpert, et al. The Downtown Book: The New York Art Scene 1974-1984. Princeton: Princeton University Press, 2005. 
McCormick, Carlo & Walter Robinson. "Slouching Toward Avenue D." Art in America 72. 6 (1984): 138, 158.

External links
8BC records from the Archives of American Art

Nightclubs in Manhattan
Defunct art museums and galleries in Manhattan
East Village, Manhattan
1983 establishments in the United States
1985 disestablishments in New York (state)
Art galleries established in 1983
Art galleries disestablished in 1985